Crosbie is a name. Notable people with the name include:

Given name
Crosbie E. Saint, an American military officer

Surname
Annette Crosbie, Scottish television actress
Ches Crosbie, Newfoundland lawyer and politician
Chesley Crosbie, Newfoundland businessman and politician
David Crosbie (disambiguation)
Debbie Crosbie (born 1969/1970), British banker
Sir Edward Crosbie, United Irishman
James Crosbie (senator), Irish barrister, journalist and Fine Gael politician, senator 1938–51 and 1954–57
James Crosbie (Kerry politician) (c.1760–1836), MP for County Kerry 1798–1806, 1812–26
John Crosbie (1931–2020), Canadian politician
John Chalker Crosbie, Newfoundland businessman and politician
Johnny Crosbie, Scottish footballer
Luke Crosbie, Scottish international Rugby Union player
Lynn Crosbie, Canadian poet and novelist
Richard Crosbie, Irish balloonist
Robert Crosbie, theosophist
Thomas Crosbie Holdings, Irish media and publishing group
Tim Crosbie, visual effects supervisor
Virginia Crosbie, British Member of Parliament elected 2019
Viscount Crosbie, Irish peerage
William Crosbie (disambiguation)
William Crosbie (MP) (c.1740–1798), Member of Parliament for Newark 1790–1796

See also
Gerry Cinnamon (born Gerald Crosbie, 1985), Scottish musician
Crosbie baronets
Crosby (disambiguation)

English-language surnames
Lists of people by surname